Lady L is a 1965 comedy film based on the novel by Romain Gary and directed by Peter Ustinov. Starring Sophia Loren, Paul Newman, David Niven and Cecil Parker, the film focuses on an elderly Corsican lady as she recalls the loves of her life, including an anarchist and an English aristocrat. The ending of the film is very different from the ending of the novel.

Plot
As she approaches her 80th birthday, the sophisticated and still attractive Lady Lendale (widely known as "Lady L") recounts to her biographer, Sir Percy, the story of her life.

Fleeing her humble origins in Corsica, she travels to Paris, where she finds work in a brothel. There she falls in love with a thief and anarchist, Armand, and becomes pregnant by him. But before he can use a bomb to assassinate a Bavarian prince, she meets the wealthy Lord Lendale, who is so enchanted by the young woman that he offers to help her and Armand escape if she will agree to marry him. He explains that several of his high society relatives are mad and he wants new blood in his family.

Lady L becomes a woman of means, moving in high society, and together she and Lord Lendale raise a large family and many of their children achieve high class positions. In the end, however, she reveals her secret: with Lord Lendale's help, she has continued to be the lover of Armand, who has fathered all their children while posing as the family's chauffeur.

Cast
 Sophia Loren as Lady Louise Lendale / Lady L
 Paul Newman as Armand Denis
 David Niven as Dicky, Lord Lendale
 Marcel Dalio as Sapper
 Cecil Parker as Sir Percy
 Philippe Noiret as Ambroise Gérôme
 Jacques Dufilho Dufilho as Bealu
 Eugene Deckers as Koenigstein
 Daniel Emilfork as Kobeleff
 Hella Petri as Madam
 Jean Wiener as Krajewski
 Roger Trapp as police inspector Dubaron
 Jean Rupert
 Joe Dassin as a police inspector
 Jacques Legras as a police inspector
 Mario Feliciani as Italian anarchist
 Sacha Pitoëff as Bomb-throwing revolutionary
 Arthur Howard as Butler
 Dorothy Reynolds
 Jacques Ciron	
 Hazel Hughes
 Michel Piccolii as Lecoeur
 Claude Dauphin as Inspector Mercier
 Catherine Allégret as Pantoufle
 France Arnel as Brunette
 Dorothée Blank as Blonde girl
 Jean-Paul Cauvin as The Little Orphan
 Lo Ann Chan as the Chinese girl
 Sylvain Levignac
 Laurence Lignières as High society girl
 Tanya Lopert as Agneau
 Moustache as Delcour
 John Wood (uncredited) as the Photographer
 Jenny Orléans as Blonde girl
 Peter Ustinov as Prince Otto of Bavaria
 Janet Wilson as an extra

Production
MGM spent $2 million on pre-production for the film before cancelling the project.

It was later restarted as an international co-production between France, Italy and the United Kingdom. Castle Howard in Yorkshire was used for the shooting of some scenes. Interiors were shot at the Victorine Studios in Nice.

Release
The film had its world premiere at the Empire, Leicester Square in the West End of London on 25 November 1965.

References

External links 

 
 
 
 

1965 films
1965 comedy films
Films about anarchism
Films based on works by Romain Gary
Films directed by Peter Ustinov
Films set in the 1900s
Films set in Paris
Metro-Goldwyn-Mayer films
Films based on French novels
English-language French films
Films shot at Victorine Studios
1960s English-language films